Leraldo Anzaldua (born June 22, 1975 in Houston, Texas, USA) is an American voice actor, ADR director, scriptwriter and stunt coordinator who works with ADV Films and Seraphim Digital/Sentai Filmworks. He has an M.F.A. in acting from the University of Houston. In anime, he is known for providing the English voice of Yuta Togashi from the Chunibyo series, Ken Washio in Gatchaman, and Zed in Kiba.

Filmography

Anime

Film

References

External links
 
 
 Leraldo Anzaldua at the CrystalAcids Anime Voice Actor Database

1975 births
Living people
American male voice actors
American voice directors
Louisiana Tech University alumni
Male actors from Houston